W. Timothy Gallwey (born 1938 in San Francisco) is an author who has written a series of books in which he has set forth a methodology for coaching and for the development of personal and professional excellence in a variety of fields that he calls "the Inner Game". Since he began writing in the 1970s, his books include The Inner Game of Tennis, The Inner Game of Golf, The Inner Game of Music (with Barry Green), Inner Skiing and The Inner Game of Work. Gallwey's seminal work is The Inner Game of Tennis, with more than one million copies in print. Besides sports, his training methods have been applied to the fields of business, health, and education.

Career
In 1960, Gallwey was captain of the Harvard University Tennis Team. In the 1970s he learned meditation techniques which Gallwey said enhanced his powers of concentration in a manner that improved his game.

Inner game
The "inner game" is based upon certain principles in which an individual uses non-judgmental observations of critical variables, with the purpose of being accurate about these observations. If the observations are accurate, the person's body will adjust and correct automatically to achieve best performance. Gallwey was one of the first to demonstrate a comprehensive method of coaching that could be applied to many situations, and found himself lecturing more often to business leaders in the U.S. than to sports people.

Books

References

External links
The Inner Game official site
Tim Gallwey Page at BigSpeak

1938 births
Living people
American sportswriters
American motivational writers
American self-help writers
Harvard Crimson men's tennis players
American tennis coaches
American golf instructors
Writers from San Francisco